The Olivetti P6060 was the  first personal computer with a built-in floppy disk. It was presented in April 1975 by the Italian manufacturer Olivetti at the Hannover fair alongside the smaller P6040 that stored data on proprietary 2.5-inch mylar floppies called Minidisk (3 KB).

Description 

The engineering team that devised the P6060 wanted to enclose into the machine everything the user would need, by integrating not only the printer but also the floppy drive. Thus it became the first Personal Computer to have this unit built into its interior. Its central processing unit was on two cards, code named PUCE1 and PUCE2, with TTL components. It had an 80-column graphical thermal printer, 48 Kbytes of RAM, and BASIC language. It was in competition with a similar product by IBM that had an external floppy disk drive.

The assembly line was located in the Olivetti factories of Scarmagno, some modules forming subsets of the machine as a printer or floppy disks were manufactured at plants in San Bernardo d'Ivrea.

External links 
 Description of the P6060 in website Old Computers Museum
 Description, manuals and photos of the P6060 and P6066 (Italian)
 Restoration work on a P6060 (Italian)

Olivetti personal computers
Computer-related introductions in 1975